Philip J. Reed is a role-playing game game designer and Chief Operating Officer for Steve Jackson Games.

Career
Philip J. Reed has worked in the RPG industry since 1995 for West End Games, Privateer Press, Atlas Games, and Steve Jackson Games. Reed began an independent blog in 2002, posting reviews or short articles about games. In September 2002, Reed released the PDF 101 Spellbooks (2002) for the d20 system. Reed sold his first PDFs from his website under the Spider Bite Games imprint. In 2003, Reed and artist Christopher Shy created Ronin Arts. The company 54°40' Orphyte sold the rights to Pacesetter Ltd's game Star Ace to Reed, for which he created a website in 2003 publish a d20 version of it, but the website lasted only a year. In 2004, Reed left Steve Jackson Games to work on Ronin Arts full-time. In 2006, Reed released the ePublishing 101 PDF series. Michael Hammes and Reed wrote 4c System (2007) as a retro-clone to the Marvel Super Heroes role-playing game system from TSR. Reed went back to work at Steve Jackson Games in 2007, becoming its COO in 2008.

References

External links
 Philip J. Reed :: Pen & Paper RPG Database archive
 Philip J. Reed biography at BoardGameGeek

Living people
Role-playing game designers
Year of birth missing (living people)